The Kia Rio is a subcompact car manufactured by Kia since November 1999 and now in its fourth generation. Body styles have included a three and five-door hatchback and four-door sedan, equipped with inline-four gasoline and diesel engines, and front-wheel drive.

The Rio replaced the first generation Pride—a rebadged version of the Ford Festiva—and the Avella, a subcompact sold as a Ford in some markets. A second generation was introduced in 2005 in Europe and in 2006 in North America, sharing its platform with the Hyundai Accent, a subcompact manufactured by its sister Hyundai Motor Company in South Korea.

As of 2023, there are reports that the Kia Rio is to be discontinued in Europe and Australia.


First generation (DC; 1999) 

The first generation Kia Rio (referred internally as the "DC") was offered in both four-door sedan and five-door station wagon body styles. When released, it was the least-expensive mass-produced car to be sold in the United States. While the Rio's styling and affordability were well-received, it was derided for its poor build quality and driving experience.

The station wagon was marketed as the "Rio Cinco" in the United States, "Rio RX-V" in Canada, and "Rio Look" in Chile. The sedan version was not sold in the United Kingdom, and the station wagon was known as the "Rio" there. In Greece, both versions were sold as the "Rio". In South Korea, this was the only generation to use the "Rio" name, as the "Pride" name was used from the second generation onwards.

The first generation Rio offered only one engine for each model year in the United States: a  1.5-litre DOHC I4 gasoline engine from 2001 through 2002. Then a larger version appeared, a 1.6-litre DOHC four-cylinder rated at  used for model years 2003 through 2005. All years offered a choice of a five-speed  manual transmission or a four-speed F4A-EL automatic. An alternative of a 1.3-litre (1,343 cc) SOHC four-cylinder/eight-valve petrol, producing  was offered in some other countries, including the United Kingdom and most of continental Europe. The USA-version five-door featured power steering and a tachometer, optional on the sedan. The European version was marketed under several trim levels; standard equipment for all trims included a driver airbag. Additional features were available for promotion in Greece, including leather seats and car alarm. In Europe, the various national markets received different selections of the three engines.

The domestic Korean market versions did not include the 1.6-liter version, as the South Korean taxation system heavily penalizes cars of more than 1,500 cc. For the SOHC 1.5  was claimed. The first generation hatchback was marketed as the Rio RX-V in South Korea.

Safety features included seat belts and an airbag for the driver. ABS was available as an option for entry-line cars but fitted by default for top of the range models (i.e., Rio LX, in the UK, and Rio LS, in Greece).

There was a version called the Sports-Pac, which featured a bonnet scoop, a rear wing, golden wheels, and blue paint, all inspired by the Subaru Impreza WRX STi. Mechanically the Sports-Pac was identical to regular models, with the exception of lowered suspension.

Facelift
In 2002, the Rio received a mild redesign (for the 2003 model year in the US) including upgrades in engine, suspension, brakes, and new exterior and interior styling. After this 2002 facelift, the entire range received the "Rio SF" moniker in the domestic South Korean market, with "SF" standing for both "Science Fiction" and "Safety First".

Iranian production of the facelifted Rio by SAIPA began in 2005. The cars were not equipped with ABS or airbags until 2012, powered by a version of the 1.5 litre engine which produces  at 5,500 rpm and  torque at 4,500 rpm. In early 2012, the production ended.

Second generation (JB; 2005) 

Kia introduced the second generation (JB) in the early 2005 model year in Europe and for model year 2006 in North America, based on a redesigned platform shared with the Hyundai Accent. The engine was upgraded to a 110 hp 1.6-litre DOHC four-cylinder "Alpha II" engine now also shared with the Hyundai Accent. Other changes include a new exterior design, an increase in exterior size and interior volume, increased safety features and fuel economy. The station wagon was dropped with this generation, replaced by a new 5-door hatchback.

Kia offered the 2006 sedan as the Rio and Rio LX, the LX trim included power steering, air conditioning, and CD player. The Rio5 (USA) is offered simply in SX trim level with leather-covered steering wheel. As in the first generation, only the five-door hatchback version was offered in some European markets (including the UK). However, in the US market only the 1.6-litre gasoline engine is offered, in two body styles: a four-door-sedan and a five-door hatch. The European version's common rail diesel engine produces .

In 2007, an SX trim level was added to the Rio sedan with the same features supplied with the Rio5 SX.

In 2007, the South Korean government began testing approximately 4,000 pre-production Rio hybrid-electric models, with parent company Hyundai Kia Automotive Group later announcing and subsequently withdrawing anticipated release dates for the hybrid model.

For 2008, Kia offered the LX trim level for the Rio5 (similar to the Rio LX sedan) and a limited production of Rio5 SX Tuner models, featuring Falken FK452 tires, Tanabe strut tower brace and Eibach Federn lowering springs.

For the 2009 model year, all Rio and Rio5 trims received standard Sirius Satellite Radio (complimentary for three months) and radios with USB port & auxiliary jack, the auxiliary jack substituting for a Bluetooth mobile phone connection for devices with an earphone jack. The Kia Rio ranked 5th in the "20 least expensive 2009 vehicles to insure" list by Insure.com. According to research, the Rio is one of the least expensive vehicles to insure.

For the Malaysian market, the second generation Rio was launched on the 7 September 2005 available with only one trim level with only the hatchback body style and powered by a 1.4-litre 16 valve DOHC engine with a 4-speed automatic gearbox and was fully imported from South Korea.

Facelift

For the 2010 model year, the models received a facelift in late 2009, adopting Kia's new Tiger nose grille. In addition, the steering wheel receives the same design as the Kia Soul and Kia Forte, featuring optional Bluetooth hands-free phone operation, and the gauges cluster receives a new red backlit design. The headlights were modified slightly, with a darker appearance and parking lights and side-marker lights sharing the turn-signal housing. Side moldings on the car became narrower and body-colored. For the UK version, the Rio looks exactly the same as the US version, except that only the hatchback variant is sold there. It has Kia's new 'Tiger Nose' grille (for the 2010 model) and is powered by a 1.4-litre DOHC four-cylinder 16-valve petrol engine, or a 1.5-liter DOHC four-cylinder 16-valve diesel. They both have a five speed manual gearbox.

This facelifted Kia Rio was never being sold in the markets of Central and Southeastern Europe, apparently due to dismal sales, as well as due to the insufficient production capacities.

Safety
IIHS
The 2006 Rio received Poor to Average ratings from the Insurance Institute for Highway Safety (IIHS).

Euro NCAP
Euro NCAP test results for a LHD, 5-door hatchback variant on a 2005 registration:

Third generation (2011) 
Starting from the third generation, the Rio was split into two different models, one being the global model (codename: UB), and the other is a specific model for Russia and China (codename: QB).

Global version (UB) 

The global third-generation Rio debuted on March 1, 2011 at the Geneva Motor Show, again based on the Hyundai Accent. It was designed at Kia's design studios in Irvine, California. The vehicle feature sloping shoulder lines and wedge-shaped exteriors, which is inline with other Kia models at the time such as the 2011 Optima and Sportage. The Rio also feature its own interpretation of Kia's signature grille known as the "Tiger Nose", which is slimmed down to connect to the headlamp design. The new design includes a larger air intake. Its extended wheelbase of  improves passenger and cargo space.

The Rio in Europe also receives a 3-door model. It is mechanically identical to the 5-door, though its longer doors give it a more sporting appearance that appeals to younger audiences. The 3-door is also noticeably cheaper than the 5-door.

In November 2011, the third-generation Rio was awarded Semperit Irish Car of the Year and in December was awarded Australian Carsguide's 2011 Car of the Year award as well, triumphing over many other vehicles including the likes of the Range Rover Evoque and the recently facelifted Ford Territory.

Powertrain 
The UB Rio features 1.4-litre or 1.6-litre Hyundai GDI Gamma engines. The European market also receives the option of a 1.25-litre petrol engine, as well as a 1.4-litre or 1.1-litre CRDi turbo-diesel engine - the 1.1-litre engine having the lowest CO2 emissions and highest MPG of any non-electric or hybrid car currently on sale at time of writing; up to 88 mpg on the EU combined cycle (73 mpg in US gallons) and emitting only 85 grams of CO2 per kilometer. This market, however, lacks the 1.6-litre engine, with the 1.4-litre being the most powerful on offer.

Transmission options include a 6-speed manual and 6-speed automatic for the American market, with the European market receiving a 5-speed manual for the 1.25-litre Petrol engine, a 6-speed manual for the 1.4-litre petrol, 1.1-litre and 1.4-litre diesels and a 4-speed automatic for the 1.4-litre petrol "2" spec model in 5-door configuration. Intelligent stop & go is an option on almost all available trim and engine levels.

Facelift

Safety

Latin NCAP
The Korean-made Rio Sedan in its most basic Latin American configuration with no airbags, no ABS and no ESC received 0 stars for adult occupants and 1 star for toddlers from Latin NCAP in May 2017.

IIHS 
The 2012 Rio received Marginal to Good ratings from the Insurance Institute for Highway Safety (IIHS).

Euro NCAP 
Euro NCAP test results for a LHD, 5-door hatchback variant on a 2011 registration:

Russian/Chinese version (QB) 

Kia developed a separate Rio model for the Russian market. Production began on 15 August 2011 at the Hyundai plant in Saint Petersburg, and the QB Kia Rio was officially released in Russia on 17 August 2011. Hatchback production in Russia started in January 2012. The QB Rio features a more conservative design than the UB Rio. This version was also released to Chinese market, badged as the Kia K2.

Fourth generation (2016) 

The fourth-generation Rio also consists of two different models, one being the global model produced in South Korea, Mexico and Algeria known with the model code YB or SC, and the other is a specific model for Russia and China known with the model code FB or UC and produced in the aforementioned countries and in Ukraine.

Global version (YB/SC) 

Kia presented the global fourth-generation Rio at the 2016 Paris Motor Show. The new car was designed in Kia's California and Germany design centers and features longer front overhangs, larger hood and a more upright C-pillars for the hatchback model. The hatchback model is 15 mm longer, 5 mm wider and 5 mm shorter in height than its predecessor.

Unlike the previous generations, the fourth-generation Rio is an export-only model since it is not offered in the South Korean domestic market due to decreasing sales of its predecessor. In the country, the Rio-based Stonic crossover was offered instead.

In European markets, the car is only offered in a 5-door hatchback form, while the 3-door hatchback option was discontinued. In other markets such as the Americas, both the 5-door hatchback and sedan body styles are offered. For the North American market, the Rio is manufactured alongside the Forte at the newly-built Pesquería plant in Mexico.

For the North American market, the 1.6-liter Gamma GDi engine was replaced by the 1.6-litre Gamma II MPi starting from the 2020 model year.

Facelift 
The facelifted Rio featured changes in the front fascia with a revised bumper design. It was first introduced in Europe in May 2020, along with the inclusion of a 1.0-litre mild hybrid engine to replace the previous 1.0-litre T-GDi engine.

The facelifted model went on sale in Mexico in October 2020. In the US and Canada, the facelifted model was introduced in December 2020 for the 2021 model year for both hatchback and sedan models, with upgrades in standard equipment.

Rio Cross/Tonic 
A rugged crossover-styled variant of the Rio was released in Colombia as the Kia Tonic. It is also offered in selected Latin America countries such as Panama and Peru as the Rio Cross.

Awards 
The YB Rio won the 2017 Red Dot Award for Passenger Car Design and the 2017 iF Design Award for Discipline Product.

Safety 
The Rio has optional rear disc brakes.

Latin NCAP 
The New Rio Sedan with 1 airbag, no ABS and no ESC received 2 stars for adult occupants and 2 stars for toddlers from Latin NCAP in August 2017.

Euro NCAP 
Euro NCAP test results for a LHD, 5-door hatchback variant with standard equipment on a 2017 registration:

Euro NCAP test results for a LHD, 5-door hatchback variant with optional safety pack on a 2017 registration:

IIHS

2018
IIHS crash test results for an LHD, 4-door sedan variant with standard equipment, 2018 model year, and its top trim won the Top Safety Pick+ award:

2022
IIHS crash test results, 2022 model year:

Russian/Chinese version (FB/UC) 

The Rio produced and marketed in Russia and China (as the K2 and KX Cross) is internally referred to by the FB or UC model codes. The version for Russia differs with the YB Rio with a different design, longer wheelbase, a different line of engines and suspension settings.

The model was unveiled in Russia in June 2017. Compared to its predecessor, the QB Rio, the FB Rio received improved suspension tuning and an electric power steering. In terms of dimensions, the sedan model is  longer in length,  wider and  longer in wheelbase. Due to the revised rear suspension configuration, trunk space of the sedan model was reduced from 500 L to 480 L. The 1.4-litre Gamma engine was replaced by the Kappa engine of the similar displacement, while the 1.6-litre Gamma engine option was retained from the previous generation.

Production of the FB Rio sedan began on 4 July 2017 at the Hyundai plant in Saint Petersburg alongside the related Hyundai Solaris, and sales began on 1 August 2017. It was also offered in Ukraine and in various CIS countries, such as Belarus, Armenia, Azerbaijan and Kazakhstan.

The facelifted Kia Rio was launched to the Russian market in 2020. The updated model features a reshaped headlights and front bumper, with LED headlights in offer for higher grade levels.

Crossover versions 
In October 2017, Kia Russia introduced the Rio X-Line as a crossover-styled hatchback version of the FB Rio. The Rio X-Line has an increased ground clearance of 10 mm, modified suspension settings, and unpainted plastic body claddings to mimic crossover styling. Sales began in Russia on 14 November 2017. The Rio X-Line was also introduced in China at the 2017 Auto Shanghai as the Kia KX Cross. The KX Cross is  wider and  longer than the standard Rio hatchback.

Sales 
The Rio/K2 was Kia's best selling model worldwide in 2012 and 2015.

References

External links

 (U.S., sedan)
 (UK, hatchback)

Cars introduced in 1999
2000s cars
2010s cars
Euro NCAP small family cars
Latin NCAP small family cars
Front-wheel-drive vehicles
Hatchbacks
Rio
Sedans
Station wagons
Subcompact cars